Saifuzzaman Chowdhury Jewel is a Jatiya Party (Ershad) politician and the former Member of Parliament of Faridpur-2.

Career
Jewel was elected to parliament from Faridpur-2 as a Jatiya Party candidate in 1988. He is the Joint Secretary of Parliament Members' Club.

References

Jatiya Party politicians
Living people
4th Jatiya Sangsad members
Year of birth missing (living people)